Chromatic, a word ultimately derived from the Greek noun χρῶμα (khrṓma), which means "complexion" or "color", and then from the Greek adjective χρωματικός (khrōmatikós; "colored"), may refer to:

In music
Chromatic scale, the western-tempered twelve-tone scale
Chromatic chord, chords built from tones chromatically altered from the native scale of the musical composition
Chromaticism, the use of chromatic scales, chords, and modulations
Total chromatic, the use of all twelve pitches of the chromatic scale in tonal music
Chromatic fantasia, a specific form of fantasia originating in sixteenth century Europe
The Chromatic button accordion
The chromatic harmonica
Chromatic genus, a genus of divisions of the tetrachord characterized by an upper interval of a minor third
Diatonic and chromatic, as a property of several structures, genres, and other features in music, often contrasted with diatonic
Chromatics (band), an American electronic music band
Chromatica, the sixth studio album by American singer Lady Gaga

In optics, vision, and color
Colorimetry, the science of color is sometimes called chromatics
Chromaticity, the quality of a color as determined by its "purity" and dominant wavelength
Chromatic aberration, departures from perfect imaging in optics systems due to dispersion
Chromatic dispersion, the dispersion of light due to differing refraction index for different wavelengths
RG Chromaticity, a two-dimensional color space in which there is no color intensity information
Chromatic adaptation, the ability for some organisms to perceive objects similarly in varying lighting conditions

In mathematics
Chromatic polynomial, a polynomial which encodes the number of different ways to vertex color a graph using n colors
Chromatic numbering
Chromatic index
Acyclic chromatic number
Strong chromatic number
Fractional chromatic number
Vertex chromatic number

Other uses
Von Luschan's chromatic scale, a method for classifying skin color
Chromatic dragon in Dungeons & Dragons
chromatic (programmer), a Perl programmer and writer
Chromatics Inc., a manufacturer of color graphics display systems
chromatic, of biological material, the ability to take up staining

See also

In music
Twelve tone technique
Serialism
Equal temperament
Sequence

In Ancient Greek and Byzantine music
Diatonic
Enharmonic
Byzantine Music
Maqam (disambiguation)

In optics, vision and color
color
International Commission on Illumination, the international authority on light, illumination, colour, and colour spaces.